Serrivomer schmidti is an eel in the family Serrivomeridae (sawtooth eels). It was described by Marie-Louise Bauchot in 1953. It is a marine, deep water-dwelling eel which is known from the eastern and western Atlantic Ocean, including Cape Verde, Senegal, the Gulf of Guinea, and Brazil.

The diet of S. schmidti consists of small bony fish and crustaceans. It is not of commercial interest to fisheries.

Etyomology
Although not identified by name, it was probably named in honor of biologist Johannes Schmidt (1877-1933), who led the Dana fishery research cruises of which during the type specimen was collected. He is also director of the Carlsberg Laboratory.

References

Serrivomeridae
Taxa named by Marie-Louise Bauchot
Fish described in 1953